The New Adventures of Nero Wolfe is a 1950–51 American radio drama series starring Sydney Greenstreet as Rex Stout's fictional armchair detective Nero Wolfe. Based on Stout's principal characters but not his stories, the series aired October 20, 1950 – April 27, 1951, on NBC. It is regarded as the series that is most responsible for popularizing Nero Wolfe on radio.

Production

The New Adventures of Nero Wolfe stars Sydney Greenstreet as Rex Stout's fictional detective genius Nero Wolfe. Produced by Edwin Fadiman and directed by J. Donald Wilson, the series aired on NBC from October 20, 1950 to April 27, 1951. Don Stanley was the announcer. The episodes were written by Alfred Bester and others.

Wolfe's legman Archie Goodwin was played by a succession of actors including Gerald Mohr, Herb Ellis, Lawrence Dobkin, Harry Bartell, Lamont Johnson and Wally Maher.

Biographer John McAleer reported that Stout enjoyed Greenstreet's portrayal. The New Adventures of Nero Wolfe was the first radio series that, like the Nero Wolfe stories themselves, stressed characterization over plot. It is regarded as the series that is most responsible for popularizing Nero Wolfe on radio. All but one episode ("The Case of the Headless Hunter") has survived in radio collections.

Greenstreet suffered from both diabetes and Bright's Disease, and his health fluctuated during the run of the radio program.

Episodes

See also 
The Adventures of Nero Wolfe, a 1943–44 ABC radio series starring Santos Ortega and Luis van Rooten
The Amazing Nero Wolfe, a 1945 Mutual radio series starring Francis X. Bushman
 Nero Wolfe (1982 radio series), a 1982 Canadian Broadcasting Corporation radio series starring Mavor Moore

References

External links
The New Adventures of Nero Wolfe at the Internet Archive

American radio dramas
Detective radio shows
1950s American radio programs
1950 radio programme debuts
1951 radio programme endings
Radio programmes based on novels
Nero Wolfe
NBC radio programs